Adams Township is one of twelve townships in Warren County, Indiana.    According to the 2010 census, its population was 512 and it contained 250 housing units.

History
Adams Township was formed in 1848 and was named after the sixth president of the United States, John Quincy Adams.

Geography
Its only town is Pine Village in the northwest part of the township, though a tiny hamlet named Chatterton stood southeast of Pine Village in the early part of the 20th century.

Big Pine Creek enters the township from Benton County to the north and passes just to the northwest of Pine Village and continues southwest, emptying into the Wabash River near Attica.

Cemeteries
The township contains three cemeteries. Harman Cemetery is less than a mile further to the southeast. Quaker Cemetery is southwest of Chatterton.

Transportation
Two highways, Indiana State Road 26 and Indiana State Road 55, intersect in Pine Village; State Road 26 begins at the Illinois border and continues east to Lafayette in Tippecanoe County, while State Road 55 enters from Attica to the south and continues north to Oxford in neighboring Benton County.

Education
Adams Township is part of the Metropolitan School District of Warren County.  It contains one of the three elementary schools in the county, located in Pine Village.

Government
Adams Township has a trustee who administers rural fire protection and ambulance service, provides relief to the poor, manages cemetery care, and performs farm assessment, among other duties. The trustee is assisted in these duties by a three-member township board. The trustees and board members are elected to four-year terms.

Adams Township is part of Indiana's 8th congressional district, Indiana House of Representatives District 26, and Indiana State Senate District 38.

References

 
 United States Census Bureau TIGER/Line Shapefiles

Bibliography

External links

Townships in Warren County, Indiana
Populated places established in 1848
Townships in Indiana